Jim Aslanides is a former Republican member of the Ohio House of Representatives, representing the 94th District from 1999 to 2008.

He is the current president of the Ohio Oil & Gas Association.

References

External links

Living people
Republican Party members of the Ohio House of Representatives
Year of birth missing (living people)
21st-century American politicians